Rhys Jacks (born 21 January 1990) is a Canada international rugby league footballer who plays as a  for the Easts Tigers in the Intrust Super Cup.

He previously played for the Sheffield Eagles in the Kingstone Press Championship in 2016, and for the Toronto Wolfpack during their inaugural season in 2017. Jacks played as a Canada international in 2015.

Background
Jacks was born in Brisbane, Queensland, Australia. Although he is of Canadian descent, as his grandfather was born in Toronto, he does not have a Canadian passport as citizenship is limited to only the first-generation born outside of Canada.

Career
Jacks has played for the Souths Logan Magpies in the Queensland Cup and was previously in the system of the Easts Tigers.

Jacks is a Canadian international. His brother Ryley Jacks is a fellow representative for Canada.

Jacks joined the Toronto Wolfpack in 2017. Later that year, in October, he was named as one of five players to leave the Wolfpack before the 2018 season. He was released to make room for other international players; per Rugby Football League (RFL) rules a club may not have more than five overseas quota players—those from outside the United Kingdom and the European Union, and in the Wolfpack's case also Canada, the United States and Jamaica—as he does not hold Canadian citizenship.

Upon return to his native Australia  for the 2018 season, Jacks signed with the Sunshine Coast Falcons.  Jacks returned to his initial rugby league organization of the Easts Tigers for the 2019 season.

References

External links
Toronto Wolfpack profile
Sheffield Eagles profile

1990 births
Living people
Australian people of Canadian descent
Australian expatriate sportspeople in England
Australian rugby league players
Canada national rugby league team captains
Canada national rugby league team players
Canadian expatriate sportspeople in England
Rugby league halfbacks
Rugby league hookers
Rugby league players from Brisbane
Sheffield Eagles players
Sportsmen from Queensland
Toronto Wolfpack players